Robert Kateera sometimes spelt as Katera (born 1995) is a Ugandan social entrepreneur and activist based in Canada. He is the founder of Trudeau Youth Council Foundation, a foundation he founded after his cousin was born without a shinbone. Through the foundation he provides prosthetics and other walking aids to children 18 and under in Uganda.

Early life
Kateera was born in Kampala, Uganda where he lived with his parents and siblings. He did his primary school at Uganda Martyrs Primary School. After Taibah College, he relocated to Canada where he did his flight training with Toronto Airways, a Canadian flight academy

Trudeau Youth Foundation
In 2019, he started Trudeau Youth Council Foundation, after her cousin was born without a tibia and a knee cap. As a result, Kateera labored nonstop to find a solution. Getting an artificial  limb was the idea he'd ever done for his cousin, and it was from there that the desire to aid other children, particularly those who couldn't afford one, arose. The Foundation advocates for young amputees and children with limb disorders, as well as to work closely with specialists and the community to ensure that they are self-sufficient. The foundation seeks to accomplish this by providing prosthetic and orthodontic devices to underprivileged youngsters (ages 2 to 18).

References

External links
Robert Kateera: Helping Amputee Children Walk Again
Through Trudeau Youth Council, Robert Kateera is Helping Amputees Walk Again | The Kampala Post
Meet Robert Kateera, a Ugandan helping amputee children walk again
Canadian Premier Trudeau Appoints Uganda’s Robert Kateera to Head Youth Council

Living people
Ugandan Christians
Social entrepreneurs
social entrepreneurs
social entrepreneurs
1995 births